KTAG (97.9 FM) is a radio station broadcasting a hot adult contemporary music format. It is licensed to Cody, Wyoming.  The station is currently owned by the Big Horn Radio Network, a division of Legend Communications of Wyoming, LLC. It features local programming.

All five stations of the Big Horn Radio Network have their offices and studios located on Mountain View Drive in Cody. KCGL and KTAG use a transmitter site on Cedar Mountain off Highway 14, west of Cody.

References

External links

TAG
Hot adult contemporary radio stations in the United States
Adult top 40 radio stations in the United States
Cody, Wyoming
1981 establishments in Wyoming
Radio stations established in 1981